The Clay Marble is a 1991 children's novel by Minfong Ho. It is set in war-torn Cambodia after the fall of the Khmer Rouge in the early 1980s. It is about a girl named Dara and her friend Jantu, and illustrates the struggles they face. It also shows how brave a girl can be and all the effects and sufferings of the war.

12-year-old Dara, her older brother Sarun, and their mother journey to the Thai border in search of rations. Here they meet the remnants of another Cambodian family, one of whose members, Jantu, becomes Dara's friend; another, Nea, falls in love with Sarun. Life is going along well until in fighting among neighboring guerrilla groups forces the families to flee again. In the confusion, Dara and Jantu become separated from the main group. After many incidents, they are reunited with their families, although Jantu is shot in the process and dies soon after. Sarun, once a proud farmer, decides to join the military. Dara courageously stands up to him, and convinces him to return home with the family. The title comes from Jantu's effervescence and manual dexterity, the combination of which impresses Dara as magic. She believes a clay marble, having been invested with Jantu's magic, gives her the courage to get through her ordeals. She wishes for luck and more from the marble, only to find out the "magic" is within herself. The story gives the reader insight on a child refugee's perspective of war and the consequences of it.

http://www.members.authorsguild.net/minfong/

1991 American novels
American children's novels
Novels set in Cambodia
1991 children's books